Diego Mandagaran is a Uruguayan retired association football midfielder who played professionally in the Major Indoor Soccer League, National Professional Soccer League and American Professional Soccer League.

On October 21, 1989, the St. Louis Storm of the Major Indoor Soccer League signed Mandagaran  He played one season in St. Louis. The Storm did not renew his contract in 1990 and Mandagaran moved to the Milwaukee Wave of the National Professional Soccer League. In the summer of 1992, he played four games for the Miami Freedom in the American Professional Soccer League. Despite the low number of games, he was selected as Second Team All League.  That fall, he moved to the Kansas City Attack of the NPSL. In June 1993, he played in an exhibition game with the Chicago Power. His performance led to a contract for the 1993-94 season.

References

External links
 MISL: Diego Mandagaran

Living people
1963 births
American Professional Soccer League players
Chicago Power players
Kansas City Attack players
Miami Freedom players
Milwaukee Wave players
Major Indoor Soccer League (1978–1992) players
National Professional Soccer League (1984–2001) players
St. Louis Storm players
Uruguayan footballers
Uruguayan expatriate footballers
Association football midfielders
Expatriate soccer players in the United States
Uruguayan expatriate sportspeople in the United States